Eupithecia mima is a moth in the family Geometridae. It is found in Uzbekistan, Kazakhstan, Pakistan and Mongolia.

References

Moths described in 1989
mima
Moths of Asia